The Hungarian Pirate Party is a political party in Hungary based on the Swedish Pirate Party. The party is focused on copyright and patent reform, internet freedom, and government transparency.

The party was founded in 2011, when its leaders left the Politics Can Be Different (LMP).

Election results

National Assembly

External links
 Kalózpárt official website 

Hungary
Political parties in Hungary
Political parties established in 2011
2011 establishments in Hungary